Guards are an American three piece rock band. They consist of Richie Follin, Loren Humphrey, and Kaylie Church. They released their debut album, In Guards We Trust, in February 2013.

History

2010: Formation 
Guards formed in New York City when Follin finished a European tour and went to a recording studio. He began writing and recording with his sister's band, Cults, and he ended up singing the songs. They put the songs on the internet and began to get show offers, so he formed Guards consisting of himself, Loren Humphrey, and Kaylie Church. Follin and Humphrey were originally of the band The Willowz. The trio caught the attention of 3 Syllables Records and they released their eponymous debut EP on the label in 2010. They released their first single, "Resolution of One", on Small Plates Records in December 2010. The single was re-released in May, 2011, on Kitsuné Music, with B-sides "Hear You Call" and "Swimming After Dark".

NPR stated the band has "a sound deconstructed through the minds of musicians who look more to memories than they do to the future, and in the process find something that sounds like a new discovery.”. Dazed and Confused had this to say about the band, "the songs are uncompromisingly raw harnessing pessimistic heartache to craft tracks about birth, death and any emotional malaise you might experience in between.”. The Guardian said, "It's pretty fucking impressive”.

2013: Debut album 
The band released their first full length album “In Guards We Trust" in 2013. The Wall Street Journal touted the record as “one of the years best albums.”, and Pitchfork proclaimed “... slack verses with palm-muted guitars give way to a monster chorus delivered with the confidence that tells you Guards know they have a hit on their hands.”. The NME would refer to the band as “Cali reverb scuzz kings”. NPR said, “At a time in music when pop, rock, country and hip-hop acts all strain to create anthems that will inspire sing- along devotion in large-size audiences, Guards—a band that's only been around for a few years and has released comparatively little music—is already well on its way to giving the anthem form more interest and gravitas than musicians with far more experience.”. Stereogum added in their review of the album, “... widescreen indie-pop garnished with epic hooks and hum-along melodies...[the album] takes a simple new-wave riff and builds layers upon it, reaching soaring, cinematic climaxes on the chorus, showcasing singer Richie Follin’s yearning vocal, always in service of the song’s central and indelible hook.” The Los Angeles Times proclaimed, “Guards toy with loud-soft dynamics, and touch on pastel harmonies and thick, almost ‘60s garage rock riffs, but it’s the back and forth between keyboardist Kaylie Church and Richie Follin that sets the group apart.”. IFC premiered the band's video for "Silver lining" and stated, “It’s a boisterous and driving track that shows Guards doing what it does best: Making raucous rock with a retro edge and undeniable appeal.”.

Guards toured worldwide the entire year in support of their debut album opening for acts including Queens of the Stone Age, MGMT, Two Door Cinema Club, Palma Violets and playing such festivals as Coachella, Lollapalooza, and Primavera Sound.

The song "I know it's you" off the album was featured in FIFA 14 and in the film Endless Love. The song "Silver lining" is featured in the BIG 10 "Maps" television commercial.

Discography

Albums

EPs

Singles

Members 
 Richie James Follin – vocals, guitar
 Loren Humphrey – drums
 Kaylie Church – keyboards, vocals

References 

Indie rock musical groups from New York (state)
Musical groups established in 2010
2010 establishments in New York City